No. 4 (officially stylized as № 4) is the fourth studio album by American rock band Stone Temple Pilots, released on October 26, 1999, by Atlantic Records. The album was a return to the band's earlier hard rock roots, while also blending elements of heavy metal, psychedelic rock, and alternative rock. Despite the lack of promotion due to singer Scott Weiland's one-year jail sentence shortly before the album's release, No. 4 was certified Platinum by the RIAA on August 7, 2000, and by the CRIA in August 2001. The song "Down" was nominated for Best Hard Rock Performance at the Grammy Awards. The album also produced one of STP's biggest hits, "Sour Girl", which charted at #78 on the Billboard Hot 100, their only song to appear on that chart. The CD was originally released as a digipak, then later changed to a standard jewel case.

Musical style
No. 4 displays the band returning to the more hard rock-oriented sound of their first two albums. Stephen Thomas Erlewine of AllMusic cited the album as STP's "hardest effort" since Core, remarking that "it's as if STP decided to compete directly with the new generation of alt-metal bands who prize aggression over hooks or riffs." Erlewine also commented that No.4 "consolidates all [of STP's] strengths."

Reception

AllMusic critic Stephen Thomas Erlewine rated the album four out of five stars, praising the opening tracks "Down" and "Heaven & Hot Rods". Entertainment Weekly critic Rob Brunner graded it "C", calling the album "generic and phoned in" and mostly "unexciting and obvious". Brunner deemed the track "Down" as "dour", "No Way Out" as "dated", and "Atlanta" as "pretentious". Brunner further deemed the tracks "Sex & Violence" and "Pruno" as "hardly original" and having resemblances to David Bowie but also as "well-crafted". Rolling Stone critic Lorraine Ali rated it three out of five, calling the songs "strong pop-rock pieces but without the self-consciousness of previous efforts". CMJ New Music Monthly critic M. Tye Comer called the album "powerful and cohesive", recommending readers to listen the tracks "Heaven & Hot Rods", "Church on Tuesday", "Sour Girl", and "No Way Out". Critics noted similarities between "Atlanta" and "My Favorite Things" from the 1959 musical The Sound of Music.

Album cover
The cover art for No. 4 generated some brief controversy because it strongly resembled the cover of the debut EP from Washington, D.C.-based band Power Lloyd. The Power Lloyd CD Election Day had been released in 1998, and the cover was a white five-point star on a black field under the band's name; STP's No. 4 also featured a white five-point star on a black field under the band's name. Power Lloyd co-founder Gene Diotalevi explained that after their band had given a song to MTV to be used on the soundtrack of Celebrity Deathmatch, someone at MTV with an advance copy of No.4 noticed that the covers were nearly identical, and alerted the band. Diotalevi stated that no one from STP's camp would return their calls or letters, until his band mailed a cease-and-desist letter to STP's record company. STP's legal team then "made an offer to settle that was unacceptable to us", according to Power Lloyd's lawyer Will Shill.

Track listing

Personnel
Stone Temple Pilots
 Scott Weiland – vocals, organ on "Heaven & Hot Rods"
 Dean DeLeo – guitars, acoustic guitar on "I Got You", lapsteel on "I Got You", six-string bass on "I Got You"
 Robert DeLeo – bass, percussion on "Church on Tuesday" and "Sour Girl", guitars on "Sex & Violence" and "Glide", fuzz bass on "Glide", zither on "Glide", electric guitars on "I Got You"
 Eric Kretz – drums, percussion on "No Way Out" and "Atlanta"

Additional personnel
 Brendan O'Brien – producer, mixing, backing vocals on "Pruno" and "I Got You", keyboards on "Church on Tuesday", percussion on "Church on Tuesday", "Sour Girl", "Sex & Violence" and "I Got You", backing vocals on "Sour Girl", piano on "Glide" and "I Got You"

 David Campbell – string arrangement on "Atlanta"
 Suzie Katayama – contractor and cello
 Joel Derouin – concertmaster
 Evan Wilson – viola
 Larry Corbett – cello
 Barrett Martin – bass marimba on "Atlanta"
 Nick DiDia – recording engineer
 Russ Fowler – recording engineer
 Dave Reed – engineer
 Allen Sides – engineer
 Stephen Marcussen – mastering
 Andrew Garver – digital editing
 Erin Haley – production coordinator
 Cheryl Mondello – production coordinator
 Richard Bates – art direction
 Andrea Brooks – art direction
 Chapman Baehler – photography
 Steve Stewart – management

Charts
"No. 4" and its singles made several appearances on the North American Billboard charts.

Weekly charts

Year-end charts

Singles

Certifications

In popular culture
The album and its entire tracklisting is displayed in S1E7 of HBO's True Detective, during a scene in which Matthew McConaughey and Woody Harrelson's characters converse in a diner.

References

1999 albums
Albums produced by Brendan O'Brien (record producer)
Atlantic Records albums
Stone Temple Pilots albums